Foxfire is the glow from a forest fungus.

Foxfire may also refer to:

Entertainment
Foxfire (novel), a 1950 Western novel by Anya Seton
Foxfire (1955 film), an adaptation of Seton's novel
 Foxfire (comics), a fictional character from Marvel Comics' Squadron Supreme series
 Foxfire (magazine), and book series, associated with the Foxfire project, concerning Appalachian culture
 Foxfire (play), 1982, based on the Foxfire project
 Foxfire (1987 film), a TV movie starring John Denver, based on the 1982 play
 Foxfire: Confessions of a Girl Gang, a 1993 novel by Joyce Carol Oates
 Foxfire (1996 film), based on the Oates novel
 Foxfire: Confessions of a Girl Gang (2012 film), based on the same novel

Other uses
 Foxfire, North Carolina, a small U.S. town
 Fox-fire (kitsunebi), glowing balls carried by kitsune (foxes) in Japanese folklore
 The Diavik Foxfire diamond, a 187.7 carat gem from the Diavik Diamond Mine
 Fox Fire, a Northern California wildfire that occurred in September 2020

See also
Firefox (disambiguation)